John Black may refer to:

Sportspeople
John Black (baseball) (1890–1962), Major League Baseball first baseman
John Black (footballer, born 1900) (1900–1993), Scottish footballer
John Black (footballer, born 1914) (1914–1992), Scottish footballer
John Black (footballer, born 1957), Scottish footballer
John Black (rugby union) (born 1951), New Zealand rugby union player
John Black (sport shooter) (1882–1924), Canadian Olympic sport shooter
John Black (golfer) (1879–1963), Scottish golfer

Politicians
John Black (U.S. senator) (1800–1854), Mississippi judge and politician
John Black (Lower Canada politician) (c. 1764–after 1819), shipbuilder and politician in Lower Canada
John Black (New Brunswick politician) (1856–1936), lawyer and politician in New Brunswick, Canada
John Black (merchant) (c. 1765–1823), merchant and politician in New Brunswick
John Black (Georgia politician) (1933–2017), member of the Georgia State Senate
John Black (Missouri politician), member of the Missouri House of Representatives
John Black (Wisconsin politician) (1830–1899), Milwaukee mayor, 1878–1880
John C. Black (1839–1915), U.S. Congressman and soldier
John Black (Australian politician) (born 1952), Australian Senator
John Wycliffe Black (1862–1951), Liberal MP for Harborough, Leicestershire, 1923–1924
John H. Black in 158th New York State Legislature

Characters
John Black (Days of Our Lives), a fictional character on the NBC soap opera Days of our Lives
"Ugly John" Black, M*A*S*H
John Black, character of Age of Empires III Act II
John Black, character in Babes in Arms

Other
John Black (martyr) (died 1566), Scottish Roman Catholic martyred on the same night David Rizzio was murdered
John Black (privateer) (1778–1802), English captain, privateer and survivor of the mutiny on the Lady Shore
John Black (journalist) (1783–1855), British editor of the Morning Chronicle, 1817–1843
John Black (Canadian judge) (1817–1879), Scottish-born, judge in Canada and politician in Australia
John McConnell Black (1855–1951), Australian botanist
Sir John Black (businessman) (1895–1965), British motor industry executive
John D. F. Black (1932–2018), American television writer from the 1950s to the 1980s
John Black (cryptographer), American computer science professor
John Black (director) (born 1940), retired British TV director
John Black (clergyman) (1818–1882), Presbyterian clergyman who emigrated from Scotland to the Red River Colony
John Black (composer) (c. 1520–1587), Scottish singer and composer
John Nicholson Black (1922–2018), principal of Bedford College, University of London, 1971–1981
J. B. Black (1883–1964), Scottish historian
J. R. Black (1826–1880), Scottish publisher, journalist, writer, photographer, and singer
John Black (music manager) (born 1967), British music manager
John Melton Black (1830–1919), pioneer of Townsville, Queensland, Australia
John Sutherland Black (1846–1923), Scottish biblical scholar
John Logan Black (1830–1902), Confederate Army officer
John D. Black (1883–1960), American economist
John Janvier Black (1837–1909), American surgeon and writer

See also

The Soul of John Black, an American soul group
 John Gotti (1940–2002), nicknamed "Black John", U.S. mobster
Black Jack (disambiguation)
Jack Black (disambiguation)

Black (disambiguation)
John (disambiguation)